"My Baby Loves Lovin'" was the top selling single for the British pop group White Plains. The song was written by Roger Cook and Roger Greenaway, recorded on 26 October 1969, and released on 2 January 1970 on the Decca Records imprint, Deram Records.

Vocals
There is some debate over who sang lead vocals on the song. It was believed for many years that session singer Tony Burrows was the lead vocalist on the track; however, various sources have claimed that band member Ricky Wolff was the lead. When the tune was released, an article appeared in which the band were keen to announce that the lead vocals were performed by Wolff; but it has also been stated by band members that Wolff and Burrows sang dual lead. According to the linear notes of the group's compilation album The Deram Records Singles Collection: "Contrary to popular belief, we are assured that the lead vocals were performed by Ricky Wolff, with Tony Burrows doubling him on the chorus" but that "due to Wolff's unavailability to promote the record, it would be singer/songwriter Roger Greenaway who appeared as the main lead singer on the promotional material and TV performances".

Track listing
7": Deram / DM 280

 "My Baby Loves Lovin'" – 2:56
 "Show Me Your Hand" – 2:39

Charts

Weekly charts

Year-end charts

Cover versions

 Released in February 1970 was a rendition by the Joe Jeffrey Group. This version charted concurrently with the White Plains version and reached number 115 on the Billboard Bubbling Under Hot 100. It also reached number 23 on the Australian Go-Set Top 40 and number 11 on the retrospective Kent Music Report.
Elton John recorded his own cover in 1970.

References

External links
 Lyrics of this song
 

1969 singles
1970 singles
Songs written by Roger Cook (songwriter)
Songs written by Roger Greenaway
Deram Records singles
British songs
White Plains songs
Tony Burrows songs
Edison Lighthouse songs
1969 songs